James M. Banning  (June 11, 1865 – October 14, 1952) was a catcher in Major League Baseball in the 19th century. He played for the Washington Nationals of the National League. He appeared in one game in 1888 and two games in 1889 for the Nationals. Banning's minor league career included stints with the Fargo, ND teams of the Red River Valley League in both the 1887 and 1897 seasons. He also appeared in a 25-inning contest for Fargo against Grand Forks, ND in 1891.

References

Sources

1865 births
1952 deaths
Major League Baseball catchers
Washington Nationals (1886–1889) players
19th-century baseball players
Milwaukee Brewers (minor league) players
Duluth Freezers players
Troy Trojans (minor league) players
Detroit Wolverines (minor league) players
Hamilton Hams players
Baseball players from New York (state)